Karasburg was a constituency in the ǁKaras Region of Namibia. The main towns were Karasburg and Grünau; other populated places included Warmbad and Aussenkehr, and the border settlements of Ariamsvlei and Noordoewer. The Orange River formed part of the southern border of this constituency.

Economic activities in this constituency were mainly small-stock farming, and near the Orange River, grape production. It had a population of 16,470 in 2011, up from 15,758 in 2001.

In 2013, the constituency was divided into two: Karasburg East and Karasburg West

Politics
In the 2010 regional elections, SWAPO's Paulus Ephraim won the constituency with 1,577 votes. He defeated challengers was Desmund Desiderius Andreas of the Rally for Democracy and Progress (839 votes) and Irene Margaret Loberloth of the Democratic Party of Namibia (364 votes).

References

Constituencies of ǁKaras Region
States and territories established in 1992
1992 establishments in Namibia
States and territories disestablished in 2013
2013 disestablishments in Namibia